Rizvand (also Romanized as Rīzvand) is a village in Baladarband Rural District, in the Central District of Kermanshah County, Kermanshah Province, Iran. At the 2006 census, its population was 146, in 30 families.

References 

Populated places in Kermanshah County